Nadia A. Rosenthal FMedSci is a scientist who specializes in heart development related research. Rosenthal began her undergraduate degree at the University of Wales and then transferred to Harvard. She received her PhD from Harvard Medical School and was an associate professor of biochemistry at Boston University and an associate professor of medicine at Harvard Medical School before transferring to the European Molecular Biology Laboratory where she replaced Klaus Rajewsky who had just gone to work at Harvard Medical School. In 2006, she presented the Howard Hughes Medical Institute's Holiday Lectures together with Douglas A. Melton. She is the editor-in-chief of Differentiation.

Since 2005 Rosenthal has been chair in Cardiovascular Science at Imperial College London. In 2008, Rosenthal was appointed as founding director of the Australian Regenerative Medicine Institute, based at Monash University in Melbourne. Since 2014, she has served as scientific director of the Jackson Laboratory.

Rosenthal is the daughter of Laurence Rosenthal, and she is married to Alan Sawyer, who also worked at EMBL and the Jackson Laboratory.

Awards
2010: Honorary degree, Université Pierre et Marie Curie (UPMC), Paris

2015: Overseas Fellow of the Australian Academy of Health and Medical Sciences

References

1953 births
Living people
Harvard Medical School alumni
Members of the European Molecular Biology Organization
Boston University faculty
Harvard Medical School faculty
Fellows of the Academy of Medical Sciences (United Kingdom)
Academic journal editors
Fellows of the Australian Academy of Health and Medical Sciences